Scymnus ceylonicus is a species of lady beetle found in India and Sri Lanka.

It is a main predator on mulberry aphids.

References

Coccinellidae
Insects of Sri Lanka
Beetles described in 1858